Thomas Maude, 1st Baron de Montalt (c. 1727 – 17 May 1777) was an Anglo-Irish politician.

Montalt was the son of Sir Robert Maude, 1st Baronet and Eleanor Cornwallis, daughter of Thomas Cornwallis and Emma Charlton. He succeeded to his father's baronetcy on 4 August 1750. He was elected to the Irish House of Commons as the Member of Parliament for Tipperary in 1761 and sat until 1776. In 1765 Montalt held the office of High Sheriff of Tipperary and was invested as a member of the Privy Council of Ireland in 1768. On 18 July 1776 he was created Baron de Montalt of Hawarden in the Peerage of Ireland.

He never married and upon his death his barony became extinct. His estate and baronetcy were inherited by his younger brother, Cornwallis Maude, 1st Viscount Hawarden.

References

Year of birth uncertain
1777 deaths
Barons in the Peerage of Ireland
18th-century Anglo-Irish people
Members of the Privy Council of Ireland
Irish MPs 1761–1768
Irish MPs 1769–1776
High Sheriffs of Tipperary
Maude family
Members of the Parliament of Ireland (pre-1801) for County Tipperary constituencies
Peers of Ireland created by George III